The 2013 La Flèche Wallonne was the 77th running of La Flèche Wallonne, a single-day cycling race.

Teams
As La Flèche Wallonne is a UCI World Tour event, all 19 UCI ProTeams were automatically invited and obligated to send a squad. Six other squads were given wildcard places into the race, and as such, formed the event's 25-team peloton.

The 19 UCI ProTeams that competed in the race:

The 6 teams who were given wild cards:

Results

References

External links

La Flèche Wallonne
La Fleche Wallonne
La Fleche Wallonne